Akaki Asatiani (Georgian: აკაკი ასათიანი; born 22 October 1953) is a Georgian politician and a former Chairman of the Supreme Council of Georgia.

Before entering politics he worked as lecturer, translator, editor in the Georgian information agency Gruzinform. In 1989 he was one of the founders of the Monarchist party of Georgia and after its split founded and led the Union of Georgian Traditionalists that later entered the pro-independent bloc "Round table – Free Georgia". As one of the leaders of the bloc, after its electoral victory Asatiani was appointed first Vice-Chairman, then, on April 18, 1991, Chairman of the Supreme Council of Georgia. Nominally, he held the office until the Supreme Council had been dissolved by the Military Council. However, he withdrew from the actual governance in October 1991, citing the health problems and was replaced by Nemo Burchuladze as acting Chairman. After the coup'd'etat the Supreme Council convened first in Grozny Chechnya (in March, October 1992) where Merab Kiknadze was elected as the new Chairman.

References

Speakers of the Parliament of Georgia
1953 births
Living people
Politicians from Tbilisi
Svan people

Monarchists from Georgia (country)